Rocky Balboa  is a 2006 American sports drama film written, directed by, and starring Sylvester Stallone. It is the sequel to Rocky V (1990) and the sixth installment in the Rocky film series. It also stars Burt Young and Antonio Tarver. In the film, Rocky Balboa (Stallone), now an aging small restaurant owner, is challenged to an exhibition fight by hothead young boxer Mason Dixon (Tarver).

Development for a sixth Rocky film began after Stallone expressed regret of the outcome of Rocky V, which was viewed as a disappointing conclusion to the end of the franchise. Rocky Balboa includes references to characters and objects from previous installments, and Stallone was inspired by recent personal struggles and triumphs when writing the film. It is Stallone's first directorial effort since Rocky IV (1985) and is Tarver's only feature film appearance. Principal photography began in December 2005 and lasted until January 2006, with filming locations including Las Vegas, Los Angeles, and Philadelphia. In contrast to previous entries in the franchise, the fight choreography in Rocky Balboa was less scripted, featuring real punches thrown by Stallone and Tarver.

Rocky Balboa was theatrically released by MGM Distribution Co. in North America and 20th Century Fox internationally on December 20, 2006, thirty years after the release of the first film. Rocky Balboa received generally positive reviews, with praise for its screenplay, Stallone's performance, and heartfelt exploration of Balboa's character, with many critics labelling the film one of the best entries in the franchise. It grossed over $156 million worldwide, subverting expectations to rebound from the box office performance of its predecessor. A spin-off,  Creed, was released in 2015 and kickstarted its own series, while a seventh mainline Rocky film is in development.

Plot

Rocky Balboa, now 60 years old, is retired from boxing and lives a quiet life as a widower, having lost his wife Adrian to cancer four years prior. He now runs a small, but successful, Italian restaurant named after her, where he regales patrons with tales from his past. He also battles personal demons involving his grief over Adrian's death and his eroding relationship with his son Robert, now a moderately successful young corporate lawyer. Paulie, Rocky's best friend and brother-in-law, continues to support him whenever he can, but is guilt-ridden over his past poor treatment toward his late sister and accuses Rocky of living in the past.

Late one night, Rocky meets a woman named Marie, who was once a troublesome young girl Rocky had escorted home 30 years ago. Marie now is a single parent of a teenage son named Stephenson and nicknamed "Steps", born out of wedlock. Rocky's relationship with Marie quickly blossoms over the following weeks and he meets and bonds with Steps, providing him with a much-needed buffer for his anguish.

Meanwhile, on the professional boxing circuit, Mason "The Line" Dixon reigns as the undefeated yet unpopular heavyweight world champion, often ridiculed for having never fought a true contender. This leads to tension with the public and his promoters and encourages him to return to his roots: the small gym he first trained in and his old trainer who sagely tells him that, inevitably, he will earn back his respect through a true opponent that will test him. ESPN later broadcasts a computer simulation of a fight between a younger Rocky and Mason — likened to a modern-day version of The Super Fight —that ends in a disputed KO victory for Balboa, further riling the champ. In contrast, the simulation inspires Rocky to take up boxing again, an intention that goes public when he successfully renews his boxing license. Dixon's promoters pitch the idea of holding a charity exhibition bout at the Mandalay Bay Resort and Casino in Las Vegas to bolster Dixon's floundering popularity. In the midst of this chaos, Paulie is laid off from his job.

With some hesitation, both men agree to the match, creating a media buzz that stabs at Rocky's age and Dixon's credibility. Robert later makes an effort to discourage Rocky from fighting, blaming his own personal failings on his father's celebrity shadow, but Rocky rebukes him with some profound advice: to succeed in life, "it ain't about how hard you hit – it's about how hard you can get hit and keep moving forward;" blaming others is the coward's way. The next day, father and son meet over Adrian's grave and reconcile; Robert has quit his job to be at Rocky's side. 

Rocky sets straight to training with Apollo Creed's old trainer, Duke, who quickly surmises that Rocky can only compete by building his strength and punching power as much as possible. On the day of the match, Dixon easily dominates the first round, only to injure his left hand on Rocky's hip in the second. Rocky then makes a dramatic comeback, knocking Mason down, and surprising the audience with his prowess and chin despite his age. The two combatants beat each other severely throughout the full 10 rounds, ending with both men still standing, although Rocky gets the last punch. Rocky thanks an appreciative Dixon for the match and tells him that he is a great champion, while the audience applauds the two fighters. The result is announced as Rocky exits the ring with his family and friends: a win for Dixon by a close split decision, but Rocky does not mind the outcome, and the crowd gives him a final standing ovation. Rocky returns home and visits Adrian's grave again, thanking her for helping him in spirit; "Yo Adrian, we did it. We did it."

As the credits roll, an inset features people running up the Rocky Steps at the Philadelphia Museum of Art in response to a call from the director to do so for the film.

Cast

 Sylvester Stallone as Robert "Rocky" Balboa, retired boxer and former two-time heavyweight champion.
 Burt Young as Paulie Pennino, Rocky's moody brother-in-law and best friend.
 Antonio Tarver as Mason "The Line" Dixon, Rocky's opponent. Dixon is shown as the current heavyweight champion of the world, but a fighter who is not shown the same respect as Rocky was when he was the world champion.
 Milo Ventimiglia as Robert Balboa, Jr., Rocky's only son.
 Geraldine Hughes as Marie, a woman whom Rocky originally met over 30 years ago.
 James Francis Kelly III as Stephenson ("Steps"), Marie's son, whom Rocky befriends.
 Tony Burton as Tony "Duke" Evers, Rocky's trainer who has been his head cornerman since Balboa's second fight with Clubber Lang in Rocky III. Duke previously trained Apollo Creed, who was Rocky's nemesis in the first two films; Duke trained Rocky with Apollo's help in the third film, and he becomes much closer to Rocky after Apollo's death in the fourth film.
 Pedro Lovell as Spider Rico, Rocky's former opponent and current employee at Adrian's.
 Jacob "Stitch" Duran as himself, Mason's cutman.
 Talia Shire as Adrian Balboa (archive footage)
 Bert Sugar, well known boxing historian, as himself (credited as Ring Magazine reporter).

Production

Development
A plot element from the fifth film is not addressed in Rocky Balboas plot. In the previous film, Rocky was diagnosed with brain damage and advised never to fight again. Stallone clarified this apparent inconsistency in an interview, remarking:

When Rocky was diagnosed with brain damage, it must be noted that many athletes have a form of brain damage including football players, soccer players, and other individuals in contact sports such as rugby, etc. Rocky never went for a second opinion and yielded to his wife's wishes to stop. So with the advent of new research techniques into brain damage, Rocky was found to be normal among fighters, and he was suffering the results of a severe concussion. By today's standards Rocky Balboa would be given a clean bill of health for fighters.

Pre-production
Rocky Balboa gives nods to previous installments via the casting. The most obvious is the return of Stallone, Young, and Burton—the only actors to portray the same characters in all six installments. Tarver's appearance in the film marks the sixth time an active professional boxer has appeared in the series. Previously, Joe Frazier (Rocky), Pedro Lovell (Rocky), Roberto Durán (Rocky II), Tommy Morrison (Rocky V) and Michael Williams (Rocky V) have appeared in the series. Stallone initially wanted Roy Jones, Jr. to portray Dixon, but after Jones did not return Stallone's phone calls, he tapped Antonio Tarver to fill the role. Tarver accidentally knocked out Stallone during the filming of one of the segments of the fight.

The character Marie appeared in the original Rocky; she was portrayed by Jodi Letizia. For the final film, Marie is portrayed by Geraldine Hughes. (Although Letizia did reprise the role for Rocky V, the sole scene in which she appeared was deleted. In it, Marie was homeless on the streets of Philadelphia.) Another recognizable character who appeared in the previous five films, sportscaster Stu Nahan, provided the commentary for the computer-generated fight between Dixon and Balboa. Nahan was part of the ringside commentary team during all the bouts in the first three films and the Apollo Creed-Ivan Drago fight in Rocky IV. He was diagnosed with lymphoma during the Rocky Balboa filming, though, and died on December 26, 2007. Finally, Pedro Lovell, who portrayed Spider Rico in the original film, returns to the role in Rocky Balboa as a guest and later employee at Rocky's restaurant.

A number of sports personalities portray themselves. Jim Lampley, Larry Merchant, and Max Kellerman comprise the ringside broadcast team (all three are commentators for HBO Boxing). Sportswriters such as Bert Sugar, Bernard Fernandez and Steve Springer also appear. As for actual boxers, Mike Tyson (who had retired by the film's release) makes a cameo appearance, taunting Dixon as the fighter enters the ring. Lou DiBella, a real-life boxing promoter, portrays himself as Dixon's promoter. Several of ESPN's personalities also portray themselves. SportsCenter anchor Brian Kenny is the host of the fictional Then and Now series, while Cold Pizza and 1st and 10 hosts Jay Crawford, Dana Jacobson, Skip Bayless and Woody Paige also appear. Ring announcer Michael Buffer appeared as himself, as did referee Joe Cortez.

Regarding his decision not to have Talia Shire reprise her role as Adrian, Stallone told USA Today that, "in the original script, she was alive. But it just didn't have the same dramatic punch. I thought, 'What if she's gone?' That would cut Rocky's heart out and drop him down to ground zero." Shire herself said that, in her view, "The film has great regard for the process of mourning. Sly utilizes mourning to empower Rocky, and Adrian is made very mythical."

Filming
Principal photography began in December 2005 in Las Vegas, Nevada. In 2006, it moved to Los Angeles, California and Philadelphia, Pennsylvania.
Scenes in Philadelphia were set in staples such as the Rocky Steps at the Philadelphia Museum of Art and South Philadelphia, while Center City was featured more prominently due to Rocky Jr.'s job as an attorney. The scene where Rocky and his son were talking while walking down a quiet block was filmed between 20th–21st Streets on Walnut, just after dawn on a Sunday morning.
The production budget on the 38-day shoot was projected to be $23.5 million.

Cinematography and fight choreography 
While the dramatic portions of the movie are shot in an obviously cinematic style, the bout between Balboa and Dixon is shot in a number of different ways. The lead-in to the bout, as well as the first two rounds, are shot in a style similar to a major pay-per-view broadcast. Clips from fights in previous Rocky movies are used during the introductory teaser to introduce Balboa, while stock footage from actual Tarver fights, as well as footage from Dixon's previous fight (shown at the beginning of the film) are used as clips for Dixon's part of the teaser. The fight itself was shot in High Definition to further enhance the TV-style look of the fight.

After the first two rounds, the bout is shot in a more "cinematic" style, reminiscent of the way the fights in the other Rocky films were shot. However, unlike the other films in the series, the fight is less choreographed and more improvised than previous installments and is closer to an actual boxing match than a choreographed fight. This is a departure from the previous films, where every punch, feint, and step was carefully scripted and practiced.

According to the behind-the-scenes documentary portions of the film's DVD, there were slight continuity problems during the filming of the fight. This was said to have been due to the fact that real punches were thrown by both Stallone and Tarver, resulting in some swelling and nosebleeds earlier than scripted. The DVD release features an alternate ending in which Rocky wins the fight.

Music
Composed by Bill Conti, the Rocky Balboa film score is both an updated composition of Rocky music and a tribute to the music that has been featured in previous Rocky films. Conti, who has acted as composer on every Rocky film except Rocky IV, chose to compose the score almost entirely from musical themes used in the previous movies. Only one original theme was written specifically for Rocky Balboa and that is the theme written to represent the character of Marie.

The roughly 40-minute score was recorded in the summer of 2006 at Capitol Studios in Hollywood, California. Conti chose to pre-record the string, brass and piano tracks and then have those tracks mixed with the work of a 44 piece orchestra which he conducted. He also performed all of the piano work himself which is something he has done with each movie for which he has composed the score. Stallone also was involved in every part of the process and attended several of the recording sessions.

In addition to the score, the film features original tracks performed by Natasha Bedingfield, Three 6 Mafia, and Frank Stallone as well as classic tracks such as Frank Sinatra's "High Hopes" and The Miracles' "Ooh Baby Baby". Of the original tracks the most significant is the Diane Warren song "Still Here", performed by Bedingfield, which was reported to be the film's theme in early articles. Though it is still listed in the credits the song was dropped from the film.

Soundtrack

Whether the film Rocky Balboa has a soundtrack is subject to some debate. On December 26, 2006, Capitol Records released a CD titled Rocky Balboa: The Best of Rocky which had a logo and cover art that was identical to the film's theatrical poster.

The CD itself contains short dialogue clips and musical tracks, some of which are remixes, from all the Rocky films. Notable though is that only three of its nineteen total tracks are from the Rocky Balboa film: two dialogue tracks and the Three 6 Mafia song "It's a Fight" (the UK version contains the additional track "Still Here" by Natasha Bedingfield). This has led some to categorize the CD as a compilation while others suggest that it is a soundtrack and that the use of past material simply reflects the film's extensive use of flashbacks.

Relevant to this debate is the absence of any compositions by Rocky IV composer Vince DiCola, except for the song "Hearts on Fire", co-written by DiCola, Ed Fruge and Joe Esposito. DiCola is the only person, other than Bill Conti, to act as composer on a Rocky film and his work was used extensively on the 1991 compilation CD The Rocky Story: Songs from the Rocky Movies. The missing DiCola tracks are the only tracks on the 1991 CD that are not present on the new CD which indicates an effort to use only Rocky Balboa composer Conti's tracks.

Release

Distribution
Rocky Balboa represents a partnership between Metro-Goldwyn-Mayer Pictures, Revolution Studios, and Columbia Pictures (Columbia's corporate parent Sony Pictures Entertainment held a 20% stake in MGM). Since the Rocky series was originally produced and distributed by United Artists (now MGM's subsidiary studio), the partners jointly decided that the film could and should take advantage of MGM's newly reinvigorated domestic distribution apparatus. 20th Century Fox handles its theatrical and DVD distributions outside of the United States and Canada, while Sony Pictures Home Entertainment handled its American and Canadian video distributions. In the Philippines and Switzerland, Fox released the film through joint ventures with Warner Bros. Pictures. In Japan, the film was promoted by Fox as Rocky The Final. It opened across Japan on April 20, 2007.

Marketing
In late March 2006, the first movie teaser was released on the Internet. The full-length trailer accompanied the theatrical release of Pirates of the Caribbean: Dead Man's Chest on July 7 in select theaters.

Theatrical
The film was scheduled for release during the Presidents' Day holiday in 2007, but was moved up to right before Christmas 2006.

Home media
Rocky Balboa is available in three formats: Blu-ray Disc, DVD and UMD. It was released in Region 1 on March 20 and Region 2 on May 21, 2007. The film has made $35,622,998 in DVD sales. Features on the Blu-ray Disc and DVD include deleted scenes along with an alternate ending (where Rocky wins the split decision), bloopers, a commentary and several featurettes. In addition, the Blu-ray version features all of the DVD's content in 1080p high definition video.

Reception

Box office
The film was an unexpected box office success and exceeded studio expectations grossing over three times the opening night estimates of (at best) $2,000,000 and doing so despite a harsh spell of winter weather. The film not only finished third in its opening weekend, grossing $12,540,000, but eventually became Stallone's most successful starring role since 1993's Cliffhanger and the sixth highest grossing boxing film of all time, topped only by the first Rocky through Rocky IV and Clint Eastwood's Million Dollar Baby, and was nominated for an MTV award for best on screen duo. Total U.S. box office gross receipts were $70,269,899 while the international gross stands at $85,959,151 making for a total worldwide gross of $156,229,050.

Critical response
As of February 2023, the film had a score of 77% on Rotten Tomatoes based on a sample of 183 reviews, with an average score of 6.5/10. The site's consensus read, "Implausible but entertaining and poignant, Rocky Balboa finds the champ in fighting form for the first time in years." On Metacritic as of August 2020, it had a weighted average score of 63 out of 100 based on 36 reviews, indicating "generally favorable reviews". Audiences surveyed by CinemaScore gave the film a grade "B+" on a scale of "A+" to "F".

On the television show Ebert & Roeper, both Richard Roeper and guest reviewer Aisha Tyler gave the film a "thumbs up" rating. Among other positive reviews were from Variety, David Edelstien of New York Magazine, Ethan Alter of Premiere Magazine, Victoria Alexander of Filmsinreview.com, Jeanne Aufmuth of Palo Alto Weekly, Brett Buckalew of Filmstew.com, The Hollywood Reporter, and Owen Gleiberman of Entertainment Weekly.

Kenneth Turan of the Los Angeles Times criticized the film's premise as implausible and derivative, and the plot development as cursory, while Colm Andrew of the Manx Independent said the film "captures the look and feel of the first Rocky but becomes too much of a sentimental homage" and overall "there is little point in joining Stallone on this ultimately dull nostalgia trip".

Stallone was quoted as having told reporters that he would rather "do something that he enjoyed badly, than feel bad about not doing something he enjoyed."

The film was greeted warmly by the majority of the boxing community, with many experts believing the Rocky character is still a key symbol of the sport and that the boxing scenes were the most realistic of any film. On the DVD, Stallone attributes this to the fact that he used realistic sound-effects (the previous installments had become notorious for their unrealistic and loud sounds of punches landing) and the fact that both Stallone and Tarver threw real punches at each other.

Other media

Possible sequel
In May 2019 at the Cannes Film Festival, Sylvester Stallone said that he had another story about Rocky Balboa. By July, Stallone confirmed that a sequel/follow-up to the current film series is in development. The project will be a joint-production venture between Winkler Films Production and MGM. Stallone will serve as writer in addition to starring in the film.

Conceptualized as an epilogue story, the film is said to be about Rocky befriending a young fighter who is a foreigner, stuck illegally in the United States. Stallone states: "Rocky meets a young, angry person who got stuck in this country when he comes to see his sister. He takes him into his life, and unbelievable adventures begin, and they wind up south of the border. It's very, very timely". By May 2020, Stallone said that he is still working on the film, though it has not yet been officially green-lit by the studio. However in a November 2021 Instagram post, Stallone expressed doubt about the film being greenlit, due to his increasingly sour relationship with Irwin Winkler. In November 2022, Stallone confirmed that the studio wants another Rocky film, but that negotiations to attain part of the rights to the character from the producers stalled development. He further stated that he is writing the script and that if the studio likes his work, the film will be made.

Spin-off

In 2015, Rocky Balboa was followed by a spin-off/follow-up titled Creed, taking place nine years after the events in Rocky Balboa.

Video game
On December 13, 2006, it was officially announced by Ubisoft and MGM that a new Rocky video game, titled Rocky Balboa, was to be made exclusively for the PlayStation Portable handheld console. It was released on March 20, 2007, to coincide with the Blu-ray and DVD release.

Notes

External links

 
 Official Production Blog
 
 
 
 
 
 

2006 films
2000s sports drama films
20th Century Fox films
American sequel films
American sports drama films
Columbia Pictures films
Films about old age
Films directed by Sylvester Stallone
Films scored by Bill Conti
Films set in the Las Vegas Valley
Films set in Philadelphia
Films shot in the Las Vegas Valley
Films shot in Philadelphia
Metro-Goldwyn-Mayer films
Revolution Studios films
Rocky (film series) films
Films with screenplays by Sylvester Stallone
2006 drama films
2000s English-language films
2000s American films